Vladislav Chernobay or Владислав Чернобай (born 29 August 1975) is a former Kyrgyzstani sprinter who competed in the men's 100m competition at the 1996 Summer Olympics. He recorded a 10.88, not enough to qualify for the next round past the heats. His personal best is 10.55, set in 2002.

References

External links
 

1975 births
Kyrgyzstani male sprinters
Athletes (track and field) at the 1996 Summer Olympics
Olympic athletes of Kyrgyzstan
World Athletics Championships athletes for Kyrgyzstan
Kyrgyzstani people of Ukrainian descent
Living people